John W. Boutwell (August 3, 1845 - December 11, 1920) was an American soldier who received the Medal of Honor for valor during the American Civil War.

Biography
Boutwell served in the Union Army in the 18th New Hampshire Infantry. He received the Medal of Honor on April 2, 1865, for his actions at the Third Battle of Petersburg.

Medal of Honor citation
Citation:

 Brought off from the picket line, under heavy fire, a comrade who had been shot through both legs.

See also

List of American Civil War Medal of Honor recipients: A-F

References

External links
Military Times

1845 births
1920 deaths
Union Army soldiers
United States Army Medal of Honor recipients
People of New Hampshire in the American Civil War
American Civil War recipients of the Medal of Honor